The 1972 Nicholls State Colonels football team represented Nicholls State University as a member of the Gulf South Conference (GSC) during the 1972 NCAA College Division football season. Led by first-year head coach Gary Kinchen, the Colonels compiled an overall record of 3–8 with a mark of 1–5 in conference play, tying for seventh place in the GSC. Nicholls State played home games at Colonel Stadium in Thibodaux, Louisiana.

Schedule

References

Nicholls State
Nicholls Colonels football seasons
Nicholls State Colonels football